Tim Howard (born 23 June 1996) is an Australian field hockey player who plays as a defender for the Australian national team.

Career

Junior national teams
Howard has represented Australia at junior level in both Under 18 and Under 21 age groups.

In 2014, Howard captained the Australia Under 18 side at the 2014 Youth Olympic Games in Nanjing, China. The team won the gold medal, defeating Canada 3–2 in a penalty shoot-out following a 3–3 draw.

Howard also made his debut for the Australian Under 21 side, 'The Burras', in 2014 at the Sultan of Johor Cup. Howard also competed at the 2015 and 2016 editions of the Sultan of Johor Cup, winning a gold medal in 2016.

In 2016, Howard captained The Burras to victory at the Junior Oceania Cup, which served as a qualifier for the Junior World Cup. Howard was also a member of the team and Captained the Australian Team at the Junior World Cup in Lucknow, India, where the team finished fourth.

Senior national team
In 2017, Howard made his senior international debut for the Kookaburras at the 2017 International Festival of Hockey.

Since his debut, Howard has been a regular inclusion in the Kookaburras side, most notably winning gold with the team at the 2018 Champions Trophy in Breda, Netherlands.

In November 2018, Howard was named in the squad for the Hockey World Cup in Bhubaneswar, India.

Howard was selected in the Kookaburras Olympics squad for the Tokyo 2020 Olympics. The team reached the final for the first time since 2004 but couldn't achieve gold, beaten by Belgium in a shootout.

References

External links
 
 
 
 

1996 births
Living people
Australian male field hockey players
Male field hockey defenders
Field hockey players at the 2014 Summer Youth Olympics
2018 Men's Hockey World Cup players
Youth Olympic gold medalists for Australia
Field hockey players at the 2020 Summer Olympics
Olympic field hockey players of Australia
Olympic silver medalists for Australia
Medalists at the 2020 Summer Olympics
Olympic medalists in field hockey
Field hockey players at the 2022 Commonwealth Games
Commonwealth Games gold medallists for Australia
Commonwealth Games medallists in field hockey
Sportspeople from Brisbane
Sportsmen from Queensland
2023 Men's FIH Hockey World Cup players
Medallists at the 2022 Commonwealth Games